The Archives and Collections Society is a non-profit foundation, incorporated in 1999, dedicated to maritime history and conservation, marine research and nautical education, based on the shores of the Great Lakes, in Picton, Ontario. In December 2011, the Society changed its name to Naval Marine Archive: The Canadian Collection by supplementary letters patent.

The society specializes in maritime heritage and history - steam and sail, naval, merchant and yachting, mostly Canada/US and Europe, mostly 18th, 19th, and 20th centuries. The collections range from about 11,000 books in the reference library, to paintings and engravings, other artwork and photographs, a very extensive collection of magazines, journals and periodicals, manuscripts, log books, charts, video, film and sound tapes.

The society also took over the Canadian Society of Marine Artists in 2003; this has expanded the art holdings quite considerably.

References

External links
Archives and Collections Society
Naval Marine Archive (fully maintained pages)
Canadian Society of Marine Artists

Naval history of Canada
Learned societies of Canada

Maritime organizations
Historical societies of Canada
Organizations established in 1999
1999 establishments in Canada